Rudy Burckhardt (April 6, 1914 – August 1, 1999) was a Swiss-American filmmaker, and photographer, known for his photographs of the hand-painted billboards that began to dominate the American landscape in the 1940s and 1950s.

Life
Burckhardt was a member of the Swiss patrician Burckhardt family. He discovered photography as a medical student in London. He left medicine to pursue photography in the 1930s. He immigrated to New York City in 1935. Between 1934 and 1939, he traveled to Paris, New York and Haiti making photographs mostly of city streets and experimenting with short 16mm films. While stationed in Trinidad in the Signal Corps from 1941-1944, he filmed the island's residents. In 1947, he joined the Photo League in New York City. Burckhardt married painter Yvonne Jacquette whom he collaborated with throughout their 40-year marriage. During the mid-Fifties he worked with Joseph Cornell on "The Aviary", "Nymphlight", "A Fable For Fountains", and "What Mozart Saw On Mulberry Street". He taught filmmaking and painting at the University of Pennsylvania from 1967 to 1975. He is the great-uncle of author Andreas Burckhardt.

Burckhardt committed suicide by drowning in the lake on his property.

Exhibitions (selection)
October 25, 2014 - February 15, 2015 "Rudy Burckhardt – In the Jungle of the Big City" at 
November 4, 2011 - March 25, 2012  "The Radical Camera: New York's Photo League, 1936-1951" at Jewish Museum (New York)
September 23, 2008 – January 4, 2009 "New York, N. Why? Photographs by Rudy Burckhardt, 1937–1940" at Metropolitan Museum of Art
May 9 – July 15, 2000  "Rudy Burckhardt and Friends: New York Artists of the 1950s and '60s" at New York University

References

External links
"The Cinema of Looking", Jacket 21 
http://topics.nytimes.com/topics/reference/timestopics/people/b/rudy_burckhardt/index.html
http://www.film-makerscoop.com/search/search.php?author=Rudolph+Burckhardt
http://www.milkmag.org/burckhardt%20page.htm
http://www.moma.org/interactives/exhibitions/2002/burckhardt/
http://www.tibordenagy.com/artists/rudy-burckhardt/Burckhardt

Audio recording of Rudy Burckhardt Lecture, 1992, from Maryland Institute College of Art's Decker Library, Internet Archive
 Copyright permissions for Rudy Burckhardt, from the WATCH File

1914 births
1999 deaths
1999 suicides
Swiss emigrants to the United States
20th-century American photographers
People from Basel-Stadt
American filmmakers
People from Searsmont, Maine
Rudy
Suicides by drowning in the United States
Suicides in Maine